A statue of Henrietta Lacks was unveiled in Bristol in October 2021. According to The Guardian, the sculpture is "the first statue of a black woman created by a black woman for a public space" in the United Kingdom.

References

External links

 

2021 establishments in England
2021 sculptures
Black people in art
Buildings and structures in Bristol
Monuments and memorials in England
Outdoor sculptures in England
Sculptures of women in the United Kingdom
Statues in England